Clews or CLEWS may refer to:

 Clew, a part of a sail
 Clews (duo), an Australian pop music duo
 Clews (surname), a list of people with the surname
 Clews Competition Motorcycles, a British motorcycle manufacturer
 Climate, Land, Energy and Water Strategies (or Systems), developed for the Rio+20 conference and now assisting the UN Sustainable Development Goals (SDGs) process

See also 

 Clewes